The single-ended primary-inductor converter (SEPIC) is a type of DC/DC converter that allows the electrical potential (voltage) at its output to be greater than, less than, or equal to that at its input. The output of the SEPIC is controlled by the duty cycle of the control switch (S1).

A SEPIC is essentially a boost converter followed by an inverted buck-boost converter, therefore it is similar to a traditional buck-boost converter, but has advantages of having non-inverted output (the output has the same electrical polarity as the input), using a series capacitor to couple energy from the input to the output (and thus can respond more gracefully to a short-circuit output), and being capable of true shutdown: when the switch S1 is turned off enough, the output (V0) drops to 0 V, following a fairly hefty transient dump of charge.

SEPICs are useful in applications in which a battery voltage can be above and below that of the regulator's intended output. For example, a single lithium ion battery typically discharges from 4.2 volts to 3 volts; if other components require 3.3 volts, then the SEPIC would be effective.

Circuit operation 
The schematic diagram for a basic SEPIC is shown in Figure 1. As with other switched mode power supplies (specifically DC-to-DC converters), the SEPIC exchanges energy between the capacitors and inductors in order to convert from one voltage to another. The amount of energy exchanged is controlled by switch S1, which is typically a transistor such as a  MOSFET. MOSFETs offer much higher input impedance and lower voltage drop than bipolar junction transistors (BJTs), and do not require biasing resistors as MOSFET switching is controlled by differences in voltage rather than a current, as with BJTs.

Continuous mode 
A SEPIC is said to be in continuous-conduction mode ("continuous mode") if the currents through inductors L1 and L2 never fall to zero during an operating cycle. During a SEPIC's steady-state operation, the average voltage across capacitor C1 (VC1) is equal to the input voltage (Vin). Because capacitor C1 blocks direct current (DC), the average current through it (IC1) is zero, making inductor L2 the only source of DC load current. Therefore, the average current through inductor L2 (IL2) is the same as the average load current and hence independent of the input voltage.

Looking at average voltages, the following can be written: 
 

Because the average voltage of VC1 is equal to VIN, VL1 = −VL2. For this reason, the two inductors can be wound on the same core, which begins to resemble a flyback converter, the most basic of the transformer-isolated switched-mode power supply topologies. Since the voltages are the same in magnitude, their effects on the mutual inductance will be zero, assuming the polarity of the windings is correct. Also, since the voltages are the same in magnitude, the ripple currents from the two inductors will be equal in magnitude.

The average currents can be summed as follows (average capacitor currents must be zero):

When switch S1 is turned on, current IL1 increases and the current IL2 goes more negative. (Mathematically, it decreases due to arrow direction.)  The energy to increase the current IL1 comes from the input source. Since S1 is a short while closed, and the instantaneous voltage VL1 is approximately VIN, the voltage VL2 is approximately −VC1. Therefore, D1 is opened and the capacitor C1 supplies the energy to increase the magnitude of the current in  IL2 and thus increase the energy stored in L2. IL is supplied by C2. The easiest way to visualize this is to consider the bias voltages of the circuit in a d.c. state, then close S1.

When switch S1 is turned off, the current IC1 becomes the same as the current IL1, since inductors do not allow instantaneous changes in current.  The current IL2 will continue in the negative direction, in fact it never reverses direction. It can be seen from the diagram that a negative IL2 will add to the current IL1 to increase the current delivered to the load.  Using Kirchhoff's Current Law, it can be shown that ID1 = IC1 - IL2. It can then be concluded, that while S1 is off, power is delivered to the load from both L2 and L1. C1, however is being charged by L1 during this off cycle (as C2 by L1 and L2), and will in turn recharge L2 during the following on cycle.

Because the potential (voltage) across capacitor C1 may reverse direction every cycle, a non-polarized capacitor should be used. However, a polarized tantalum or electrolytic capacitor may be used in some cases, because the potential (voltage) across capacitor C1 will not change unless the switch is closed long enough for a half cycle of resonance with inductor L2, and by this time the current in inductor L1 could be quite large.

The capacitor CIN has no effect on the ideal circuit's analysis, but is required in actual regulator circuits to reduce the effects of parasitic inductance and internal resistance of the power supply. 

The boost/buck capabilities of the SEPIC are possible because of capacitor C1 and inductor L2.  Inductor L1 and switch S1 create a standard boost converter, which generates a voltage (VS1) that is higher than VIN, whose magnitude is determined by the duty cycle of the switch S1. Since the average voltage across C1 is VIN, the output voltage (VO) is VS1 - VIN. If VS1 is less than double VIN, then the output voltage will be less than the input voltage. If VS1 is greater than double VIN, then the output voltage will be greater than the input voltage.

Discontinuous mode 
A SEPIC is said to be in discontinuous-conduction mode or discontinuous mode if the current through either of inductors L1 or L2 is allowed to fall to zero during an operating cycle.

Reliability and efficiency 
The voltage drop and switching time of diode D1 is critical to a SEPIC's reliability and efficiency. The diode's switching time needs to be extremely fast in order to not generate high voltage spikes across the inductors, which could cause damage to components. Fast conventional diodes or Schottky diodes may be used.

The resistances in the inductors and the capacitors can also have large effects on the converter efficiency and output ripple. Inductors with lower series resistance allow less energy to be dissipated as heat, resulting in greater efficiency (a larger portion of the input power being transferred to the load). Capacitors with low equivalent series resistance (ESR) should also be used for C1 and C2 to minimize ripple and prevent heat build-up, especially in C1 where the current is changing direction frequently.

Disadvantages 
 Like the buck–boost converter, the SEPIC has a pulsating output current. The similar Ćuk converter does not have this disadvantage, but it can only have negative output polarity, unless the isolated Ćuk converter is used.
 Since the SEPIC converter transfers all its energy via the series capacitor, a capacitor with high capacitance and current handling capability is required.
 The fourth-order nature of the converter also makes the SEPIC converter difficult to control, making it only suitable for very slow varying applications.

See also
Switched-mode power supply (SMPS)
DC to DC converter
Buck converter
Boost converter
Buck-boost converter
Flyback converter
Ćuk converter

References

 Maniktala, Sanjaya. Switching Power Supply Design & Optimization, McGraw-Hill, New York 2005
 SEPIC Equations and Component Ratings, Maxim Integrated Products. Appnote 1051, 2005.
 TM SEPIC converter in PFC Pre-Regulator, STMicroelectronics. Application Note AN2435. This application note presents the basic equation of the SEPIC converter, in addition to a practical design example.
 High Frequency Power Converters, Intersil Corporation. Application Note AN9208, April 1994. This application note covers various power converter architectures, including the various conduction modes of SEPIC converters.

DC-to-DC converters
Voltage regulation